The Treaty of Paris of 1815, also known as the Second Treaty of Paris, was signed on 20 November 1815, after the defeat and the second abdication of Napoleon Bonaparte. In February, Napoleon had escaped from his exile on Elba, entered Paris on 20 March and began the Hundred Days of his restored rule. After France's defeat at the hands of the Seventh Coalition at the Battle of Waterloo, Napoleon was persuaded to abdicate again, on 22 June. King Louis XVIII, who had fled the country when Napoleon arrived in Paris, took the throne for a second time on 8 July.

The 1815 treaty had more punitive terms than the treaty of the previous year. France was ordered to pay 700 million francs in indemnities, and its borders were reduced to those that had existed on 1 January 1790. France was to pay additional money to cover the cost of providing additional defensive fortifications to be built by neighbouring Coalition countries. Under the terms of the treaty, parts of France were to be occupied by up to 150,000 soldiers for five years, with France covering the cost; however, the Coalition occupation under the command of the Duke of Wellington was deemed necessary for only three years, and the foreign troops withdrew from France in 1818 (see Congress of Aix-la-Chapelle).

In addition to the definitive peace treaty between France and Great Britain, Austria, Prussia, and Russia, there were four additional conventions and an act confirming the neutrality of Switzerland, signed on the same day.

Definitive treaty

The 1815 peace treaties were drawn up entirely in French, the lingua franca of contemporary diplomacy. There were four treaties, between France and each of the four major Seventh Coalition powers: Austria, Great Britain, Prussia and Russia. All four treaties were signed on the same day (20 November 1815), had verbatim stipulations, and were styled the same way (for example the "Definitive Treaty between Great Britain and France").

The treaty was harsher towards France than the Treaty of 1814, which had been negotiated through the manoeuvre of Talleyrand, because of reservations raised by the recent widespread support for Napoleon in France. France lost the territorial gains of the Revolutionary armies in 1790–92, which the previous treaty had allowed France to keep; the nation was reduced to its 1790 boundaries (plus the enclaves of the Comtat Venaissin, the County of Montbéliard and the Stadtrepublik Mülhausen, which France was allowed to keep, but minus the Saarlouis exclave, which was French since 1697). France was now also ordered to pay 700 million francs in indemnities, in five yearly instalments, and to maintain at its own expense a Coalition army of occupation of 150,000 soldiers in the eastern border territories of France, from the English Channel to the border with Switzerland, for a maximum of five years. The twofold purpose of the military occupation was rendered self-evident by the convention annexed to the treaty outlining the incremental terms by which France would issue negotiable bonds covering the indemnity: in addition to safeguarding the neighboring states from a revival of revolution in France, it guaranteed fulfilment of the treaty's financial clauses.

Although some of the Allies, notably Prussia, initially demanded that France cede significant territory in the East, rivalry among the powers and the general desire to secure the Bourbon Restoration made the peace settlement less onerous than it might have been. The treaty was signed for Great Britain by Lord Castlereagh and the Duke of Wellington and by the duc de Richelieu for France; parallel treaties with France were signed by Austria, Russia, and Prussia, forming in effect the first confederation of Europe. The Quadruple Alliance was reinstated in a separate treaty also signed 20 November 1815, introducing a new concept in European diplomacy, the peacetime congress "for the maintenance of peace in Europe" on the pattern of the Congress of Vienna, which had concluded 9 June 1815.

The treaty is brief. In addition to having "preserved France and Europe from the convulsions with which they were menaced by the late enterprise of Napoleon Bonaparte", the signers of the Treaty also repudiated "the revolutionary system reproduced in France".

The treaty is presented "in the desire to consolidate, by maintaining inviolate the Royal authority, and by restoring the operation of the Constitutional Charter, the order of things which had been happily re-established in France". The Constitutional Charter that is referred to so hopefully, was the Constitution of 1791, promulgated under the Ancien régime at the outset of the Revolution. Its provisions for the government of France would rapidly fall by the wayside, "notwithstanding the paternal intentions of her King" as the treaty remarks. The first Treaty of Paris, of 30 May 1814, and the Final Act of the Congress of Vienna, of 9 June 1815, were confirmed. On the same day, in a separate document, Great Britain, Russia, Austria, and Prussia renewed the Quadruple Alliance. The princes and free towns, who were not signatories, were invited to accede to its terms, whereby the treaty became a part of the public law by which Europe, with the exclusion of Ottoman Turkey, established "relations from which a system of real and permanent balance of power in Europe is to be derived".

Article on the slave trade
An additional article appended to the treaty addressed the issue of slavery. It reaffirmed the Declaration of the Powers, on the Abolition of the Slave Trade, of 8th of February 1815 (which also formed ACT, No. XV. of the Final Act of the Congress of Vienna) and added that the governments of the contracting parties should "without loss of time, ... [find] the most effectual measures for the entire and definitive abolition of a Commerce so odious, and so strongly condemned by the laws of religion and of nature".

Convention on pecuniary indemnity
A convention on pecuniary indemnity regulated the mode of liquidating the indemnity of 700 millions francs to be paid by France, in conformity to the fourth article of the treaty.  The sum was to be paid, day by day, in equal portions, in the space of five years, from 1 December 1815.

Thus, France was required to pay on account of this convention 383,251 francs every day for five years, equal to about 16,000 pounds sterling at the exchange rate of the day. For this daily quota, the French government had to give assignations on the French treasury, payable to bearer, day by day. In the first instance, however, the Coalition Commissioners were to receive the whole of the 700 million in fifteen bonds of 46⅔ million each; the first of which was payable on 31 March 1816, the second on 21 July 1816, and so on, every fourth month. In the month preceding the commencement of each of these four monthly periods, France was to redeem successively one of these bonds for 46⅔ millions, by exchanging it against the first-mentioned daily assignations payable to bearer, which assignations, for the purpose of convenience and negotiability, were again subdivided into coupures, or sets of smaller sums. As a guarantee for the regular payment of these assignations, and to provide for deficiencies, France assigned, moreover, to the allies, a fund of interest, to be inscribed in the Grand Livre of her public debt, of seven millions francs on a capital of 140 millions. A liquidation was to take place every six months, when the assignations duly discharged by the French Treasury were to be received as payments to their amount, and the deficiency arising from assignations not honoured would be made good, with interest, at five percent from the fund of interest inscribed in the Grand Livre, in a manner specified in this convention.

The distribution of the sum among the Coalition Powers, agreed to be paid by France in this convention, was regulated by a separate convention, the Protocol for the pecuniary indemnity to be furnished by France and the Table of allotment:

Convention on the military line
A convention on the military line regulated all matters concerning the temporary occupation of the frontiers of France by a Coalition army of 150,000 men, conforming to Article V of the definitive treaty. The military line to be occupied, would extend along the frontiers which separated the departments of the Pas de Calais, of the North of the Ardennes, of the Meuse, of the Moselle, of the Lower Rhine, and of the Upper Rhine, from the interior of France.

It was also agreed that neither the Coalition nor the French troops would occupy (unless for particular reasons and by mutual agreement), the following territories and districts:
 In the department of the Somme, all the country north of that river, from Ham, to where it falls into the sea;
 In Aisne, the districts of Saint-Quentin, Vervins and Laon;
 In the Marne, those of Rheims, Sainte-Menehould, and Vitry;
 In the Haute-Marne, those of Saint-Dizier and Joinville;
 In Meurthe, those of Toul, Dieuze, Sarrebourg and Blamont;
 In the Vosges, those of Saint-Dié, Bruyères and Remiremont;
 The district of Lure, in the Haute-Saône; and that of Saint-Hippolyte in Doubs.

Within the line occupied by the Coalition army, 26 fortresses were allowed to have garrisons (see the table on the right), but without any materiel or equipment of artillery and engineer stores.

France was to supply all the needs of the 150,000 Coalition troops who remained in the country. Lodging, fuel, light, provisions, and forage were to be furnished in kind, to an extent not exceeding 200,000 daily rations for men, and 50,000 daily rations for horses; and for pay, equipment, clothing, &c.

France was to pay to the Coalition 50 million francs per annum during the five-year occupation: the allies, however, were content with only 30 million, on account, for the first year. The territories and fortresses definitively ceded by France, as well as the fortresses to be provisionally occupied by the Coalition troops for five years, were to be given up to them within ten days from the signature of the principal treaty, and all the Coalition forces, except 150,000 which were to remain, were to evacuate France within 21 days from that date.

The direct expense entailed upon France by this convention greatly exceeded the 700 million francs of the indemnity. Estimating the value of the soldier's portion and allowances at 1½ francs, and the cavalry ration at 2 francs, the annual cost of the deliveries in kind for 200,000 portions and 50,000 rations would have been 146 million in francs, which, with the addition of 50 million franc of money per annum, formed a total of 196 million francs per year, equal to 22,370 sterling per day at the exchange rate of the time.

Convention on private claims upon France
A convention on private claims upon France assured the payment of money due by France to the subjects of the Coalition powers, in conformity with the treaty of 1814 and to the Article VIII of the 1815 peace treaty. There were twenty-six articles in the convention, which provided for the following:
 the liquidation of all claims arising from articles furnished by individuals, and partnerships, by virtue of contracts and other arrangements with French administrative authorities;
 arrears of pay to military persons or employees no longer subjects of France;
 deliveries to French hospitals;
 loans contracted by French military or civil authorities;
 losses of money confided to the French post-office. &c.
 the restitution of the funds of the Hamburg bank, seized by Marshal Davout, to be regulated by a separate convention between commissioners from that city and those of Louis XVIII. This issue was already contentious and had been subject to secret articles in both of the 1814 Convention for a suspension of hostilities with France and the 1814 Paris Peace Treaty. The matter was settled when the French government agreed to pay compensation in a special convention signed by the parties on 27 October 1816.
 the payment of a claim of upwards of forty million francs to the Counts of Bentheim and Steinfurt.
All these claims were to be sent in within a year after the ratification of the treaty or they would be voided (Article XVI), and committees for their liquidation were to be appointed.

Articles XVII–XIX related to the payment of the claims and their inscription in the Grand Livre (general ledger). The claims under this convention were immense, so it was impossible for the parties to have a clear idea of the necessary amount at the time of the treaty's signing. As a guarantee of payment, Article XX provided that a capital, bearing 3½ millions of francs in interest, be inscribed in the Grand Livre, the interest of which was to be received half yearly by joint-commissioners.

Convention on claims of British subjects
A fourth convention related exclusively to the liquidation of the claims of British subjects on the government of France, in conformity with the Paris peace treaty of 1814, and the Article VIII of the Paris Peace Treaty of 1815. All British subjects who had suffered loss of property in France since 1 January 1791, by sequestration or confiscation by the French government, were to be indemnified. The amount of permanent stock lost was to be inscribed in the Grand Livre, and to bear interest from 22 March 1816; excepting, however, such holders as had, since 1797, voluntarily submitted to receive their dividends at a third. The same was to be the case in regard to former life annuities from the French government.

Indemnification was further granted for the loss of immovable property by sequestration, confiscation, or sale; and particular regulations were laid down for ascertaining its value in the fairest possible manner. A separate account was to be kept of arrears that had accrued for all types of property, for which arrears were to be calculated at an interest of four percent per annum. Movable properly, lost through the above causes, was also to be paid for by inscriptions according to its value, with interest calculated on it at three percent per annum. From this indemnity, however, were excluded ships, cargoes, and other movable property seized in conformity to the laws of war and the prohibitory decrees. All claims of the above, or any other description, were to be given in, within three months after the date of the signing fourth convention (20 November 1815) from Europe, six months from the western colonies, and twelve months from the East Indies, &c.

The claims were to be examined and decided on by a mixed commission of liquidation: and, if their votes were equal, an arbitrator would be chosen by lot from a mixed commission of arbitration. As a guarantee for the payment of claims sanctioned under this convention, there was to be inscribed in the Grand Livre, before 1 January 1816, a capital bearing 3½ millions francs of interest, in the name of a further mixed commission of English and French officers, who were to receive such interest; without, however, disposing of the same otherwise than by placing it in the public funds, at accumulating interest for the benefit of the creditors. As soon as the inscription had been effected, Britain would restore the French colonies as agreed in the treaty of 1814, including the islands of Martinique and Guadeloupe, which had been provisionally re-occupied by the British troops.

Act on the neutrality of Switzerland
The Swiss Confederation had been internationally recognised as an independent neutral state at the Peace of Westphalia in 1648. During the Napoleonic Wars it failed to remain neutral, as some cantons had been annexed into other states and, under French influence, the Act of Mediation was signed, replacing the Swiss Confederation with the more centralised Helvetic Republic, allied to France.  With the fall of Napoleon in 1814, the cantons of Switzerland started the process of writing a new, less centralised constitution.

On 20 March 1815, at the Congress of Vienna, the European powers (Austria, France, Great Britain, Portugal, Prussia, Russia, Spain and Sweden) agreed to recognise permanently an independent, neutral Switzerland, and on 27 May Switzerland acceded to this declaration.

However, during Napoleon's Hundred Days the Seventh Coalition suspended the signing of the Act of Acknowledgement and Guarantee of the perpetual Neutrality of Switzerland until after Napoleon Bonaparte was defeated; this allowed Coalition forces to pass through Swiss territory. So with Article 84 of the Final Act of the Congress of Vienna dated 20 November 1815, the four major Coalition powers (Austria, Great Britain, Prussia and Russia) and France gave their formal and authentic acknowledgement of the perpetual neutrality of Switzerland.

See also
 Congress of Vienna
 List of treaties

Notes

Further reading
 
 
 Webster, Charles K. The Congress of Vienna, 1814–1815 (1918) online

Attribution
 

Napoleonic Wars treaties
Peace treaties of Austria
Peace treaties of France
Peace treaties of Prussia
Peace treaties of Russia
Peace treaties of the United Kingdom
Treaties of the Austrian Empire
Treaties of the Bourbon Restoration
Treaties of the Kingdom of Prussia
Treaties of the Russian Empire
Treaties of the United Kingdom (1801–1922)
1810s in Paris
1815 in France
1815 treaties
November 1815 events